Fire Station No. 3, and variations, may refer to:

in Australia
Carlton Fire Station, Carlton, Victoria, also known as "Fire Station No. 3", Victorian Heritage-listed

in Canada
Former Fire Hall No. 3, Saskatoon, Saskatchewan

in the United States
 Fire Station No. 3 (Birmingham, Alabama), listed on the National Register of Historic Places (NRHP)
Fayetteville Fire Department Fire Station 3, Fayetteville, Arkansas, NRHP-listed
Firehouse No. 3 (Sacramento, California), known also as "Engine Co. #3 Firehouse", NRHP-listed
Fire Station No. 3 (Denver, Colorado), a Denver Landmark
 Engine House No. 3 (Fort Wayne, Indiana), NRHP-listed
Fire House No. 3, South Bend, Indiana, NRHP-listed
Engine House No. 3 (Kalamazoo, Michigan), NRHP-listed
 Fire Station No. 3 (Arlington, Virginia), NRHP-listed
Spokane Fire Station No. 3, Spokane, Washington, NRHP-listed

See also
List of fire stations